Bojan Isailović (Serbian Cyrillic: Бојан Исаиловић; born 25 March 1980) is a Serbian former professional footballer who played as a goalkeeper. He represented Serbia at the 2010 FIFA World Cup.

Club career
Isailović came through the youth ranks of Red Star Belgrade, before making his senior debut with Rad. He moved to Sevojno in late summer of 2005, staying at the club for a year and a half. In the 2007 winter transfer window, Isailović was transferred to Čukarički, immediately helping them win promotion to the top flight of Serbian football. He subsequently established himself as one of the best goalkeepers in the country, before securing a transfer to Turkish club Gençlerbirliği in the 2009 winter transfer window. After spending only a half season in Turkey, Isailović returned to his former club Čukarički. He subsequently moved abroad again and joined Polish club Zagłębie Lubin in January 2010.

International career
On 14 December 2008, Isailović made his international debut for Serbia in a 0–1 friendly loss to Poland. 

In June 2010, he was selected in Serbia's squad for the 2010 FIFA World Cup, but didn't make any appearances.

References

External links
 
 
 
 
 
 

Serbian footballers
2010 FIFA World Cup players
Association football goalkeepers
Ekstraklasa players
Expatriate footballers in Poland
Expatriate footballers in Turkey
FK Čukarički players
FK Rad players
FK Sevojno players
FK Srem Jakovo players
Gençlerbirliği S.K. footballers
Serbia international footballers
Serbian expatriate footballers
Serbian expatriate sportspeople in Poland
Serbian expatriate sportspeople in Turkey
Serbian First League players
Serbian SuperLiga players
Footballers from Belgrade
Süper Lig players
Zagłębie Lubin players
1980 births
Living people